The 2007 Plymouth City Council election was held on 3 May 2007 to elect members of Plymouth City Council in England. One third of the council was up for election and the Conservative Party gained control of the council from the Labour Party.

Overall results

|-
| colspan=2 style="text-align: right; margin-right: 1em" | Total
| style="text-align: right;" | 19
| colspan=5 |
| style="text-align: right;" | 65,458
| style="text-align: right;" |

Ward results

Budshead

Compton

Devonport

Note: The seat was won for Labour the previous time it was contested in 2003, by Bernard Brotherton who subsequently defected to the Liberal Democrats.

Drake

Efford and Lipson

Eggbuckland

Ham

Honicknowle

Moor View

Peverell

Plympton Erle

Plympton St Mary

Plymstock Dunstone

Plymstock Radford

St Budeax

St Peter and the Waterfront

Southway

Stoke

Sutton and Mount Gould

See also
 List of wards in Plymouth

References

2007 English local elections
May 2007 events in the United Kingdom
2007
2000s in Devon